The Alien literary franchise consists of multiple novels and short stories based on the eponymous film franchise, which began in 1979 with the release of Alien.

In the 20th century, all Alien-related novels published were adaptations of pre-existing material. From 1979 up to 1997, Warner Books published novelizations of the first four films in the year of release; 1979, 1986, 1992, and 1997, respectively. The first three novelizations were written by Alan Dean Foster. Throughout the 1990s, Bantam Books published nine novelizations of Alien comic books published by Dark Horse Comics.

After going on a hiatus, the franchise returned in book form in 2005. DH Press—Dark Horse Comics' novel publishing imprint—published six original novels from 2005 to 2008. This marked the first time in the franchise where novels were original stories, rather than adaptations. DH Press' series took place after the events of the fourth film; Alien Resurrection (1997), despite the fact that it was based on the second film. Following the release of Aliens: No Exit in 2008, the novel series once more went into hiatus.

In 2014, after six years, Titan Books started publication of Alien novels once more, starting with Alien: Out of the Shadows, written by Tim Lebbon. Out of the Shadows was the first in a trilogy of books, and is canon to the events of the film series. In 2016, Alien: Invasion was published, which is the second book in Lebbon's The Rage Wars trilogy; a crossover between the Alien, Predator, and Alien vs. Predator franchises. The following year, Foster would write both a novelization and prequel to Alien: Covenant (2017). The success of the novels led to the publication of further stories, including a novelization of the video game Alien: Isolation (2014).

Film and game novelizations

Dark Horse Comics adaptions

Further novels
{| class="wikitable plainrowheaders sortable" style="margin-right: 0;"
|-
! scope="col" | Title
! scope="col" | Author
! scope="col" | Publisher
! scope="col" | Date
! scope="col" | Length 
! scope="col" class="unsortable" | Notes
! scope="col" class="unsortable" | 
|-
! scope="row" | Aliens: Original Sin
 | 
 | rowspan="6"| DH Press
 | 
 | 
 | A sequel to the 1997 film Alien Resurrection. It brings back characters like Ripley 8, the clone of Lt. Ellen Ripley, and android Call. It also sorts out unanswered questions from the movies and raises entirely new ones. Was it just coincidence that the Nostromo happened to pass by the desolate planet? Why was the alien on the crashed ship in the first place?
 | style="text-align: center;" | 
|-
! scope="row" | Aliens: DNA War
 | rowspan="2"| 
 | 
 | 
 | 
It follows detective Rory Malvaux and the crew of the Vinza as they attempt to extract a group of scientists — including Rory's mother Jocasta — who have unexpectedly encountered Xenomorphs on the planet Rosamond 6. However, upon arriving, the Vinza'''s crew discover the scientists are not only unwilling to leave, but may be engaging in foul play to preserve the very creatures that stalk them.
| style="text-align: center;" | 
|-
! scope="row" | Aliens: Cauldron | 
 | 
 | 
It follows the crews of two cargo starships, the Virginia and the Umiak, as an attempt to illicitly smuggle live Xenomorphs unleashes the deadly creatures upon them.
| style="text-align: center;" | 
|-
! scope="row" | Aliens: Steel Egg | 
 | 
 | 
 | 
Set several decades before the events of the original Alien, the story concerns the crew of the UNIC Hornblower, who are dispatched on a routine survey mission to Saturn where they discover an ancient alien spacecraft in orbit around one of the planet's moons. Upon boarding the mysterious vessel, the unprepared crew soon find themselves trapped in a fight for survival against the Xenomorphs that they accidentally awaken on board.
| style="text-align: center;" | 
|-
! scope="row" | Aliens: Criminal Enterprise | 
 | 
 | 
 | 
When his brother falls into debt with ruthless drug dealers, Tommy Chase is forced to take a one-time assignment piloting one of the organization's transport ships to wipe the slate clean. The journey takes him to the remote planet called Fantasia, where the dealers operate a secret drug lab kept safe by the horde of frenetic Xenomorphs that swarm Fantasia's surface. However, when the facility comes under attack from rival forces, the creatures intended to keep the operation safe become an unstoppable threat to everyone on the planet.
| style="text-align: center;" | 
|-
! scope="row" | Aliens: No Exit | 
 | 
 | 
 | 
 | style="text-align: center;" | 
|-
! scope="row" | Alien: Out of the Shadows | 
 | rowspan="6" | Titan Books
 | 
 | 
 | Set between the events of Alien and Aliens. The novel tells the story of a group of miners harvesting trimonite, the hardest material known to man, on the planet LV-178. Deep within the mines, they uncover the ruins of an ancient civilization infested with Xenomorphs, which infiltrate the miners' spaceship, the Marion. Ellen Ripley's shuttle, the Narcissus, picks up a distress call from the Marion and docks with it, and she is left to help the miners survive the Xenomorphs as well as uncover why the shuttle seemed to dock on its own accord.
 | style="text-align: center;" | 
|-
! scope="row" | Alien: Sea of Sorrows | 
 | 
 | 
 |A follow-up to Out of the Shadows, set many years after Alien Resurrection. LV-178 is now colonized and renamed New Galveston, with Alan Decker, a deputy commissioner for the ICC, charged with making sure the settlements on the planet follow all the rules. While investigating region of the planet with incredibly toxic sands, dubbed the Sea of Sorrows, Decker's previously latent empathic abilities cause him to briefly connect with the Xenomorphs still lying dormant beneath the planet. The Weyland-Yutani Corporation sees this as another opportunity to capture one of the creatures, forcibly recruiting Decker onto a team of mercenaries to accomplish this. Decker is unable to refuse, as centuries ago, his ancestor fought the Xenomorphs, launching a bloody vendetta that was never satisfied. That was when the creatures swore revenge on the Destroyer… Ellen Ripley. 
 | style="text-align: center;" | 
|-
! scope="row" | Alien: River of Pain | 
 | 
 | 
 |In this novel, the Xenomorph infestation of Hadley's Hope on Acheron (LV-426), which occurred off-screen in Aliens, is depicted. It notably incorporates several sequences previously seen in the comic Aliens: Newt's Tale and also references the events of the Fire and Stone comic.
 | style="text-align: center;" | 
|-
! scope="row" | Alien: Invasion | 
 | 
 | 
 | This book is the second chapter in the Rage War trilogy, following up after the events of the novel Predator: Incursion. The trilogy tells the story of a rogue human faction known as the Rage, who launch an invasion against the primary human sphere of influence using an army of Xenomorph shock troopers, with the Yautja caught in the crossfire. It was succeeded by Alien vs. Predator: Armageddon.
 | style="text-align: center;" | 
|-
! scope="row" | Alien: Covenant - Origins| {{sortname|Alan Dean Foster
|
|346pp
|Prequel to the 2017 film Alien: Covenant|
|-
! scope="row" | Alien: The Cold Forge | 
 | 
 | 
 | The Weyland-Yutani Corporation breeds Xenomorphs from eggs acquired through unknown means aboard the Cold Forge, a secret deep space research station on which the company is hoping to develop the creatures as biological weapons. Dr. Blue Marsalis, the physically handicapped scientist heading the experiments, secretly seeks to harvest a sample of a virulent mutagen produced by the Xenomorphs to cure her terminal degenerative illness. Her research is put in jeopardy when Dorian Sudler, a malicious auditor from Weyland-Yutani, is sent to review the station's work. Things are only further complicated when an unknown saboteur unleashes the Xenomorph specimens from containment, setting them loose aboard the station.
 | style="text-align: center;" | 
|-
! scope="row" | Alien: Echo | 
 | Imprint
 | 
 | 
 | The first young adult novel in the Alien franchise, Echo is set on the planet Zegreus, home to a human agricultural colony that becomes the site of a Xenomorph outbreak. The protagonist, a young woman named Olivia Shipp, relies on knowledge of xenobiology taught to her by her parents to get her and her twin sister Viola offworld alive.
 | style="text-align: center;" | 
|-
! scope="row" | Alien: Prototype | 
 | rowspan="7" |Titan Books
| 
 | 352 pp
 | A sequel to Alien: Isolation, Prototype is a completely original story starring Zula Hendricks, a character from the comic books. A member of the United States Colonial Marine Corps, Hendricks is assigned with training a group of security recruits on the colony of Jericho 3, where a Xenomorph egg is unknowingly being studied by a rival corporation of Weyland-Yutani. The resulting Xenomorph inherits a genetic mutation from its host that gives it the ability to release a deadly pathogen, putting everyone in the colony at risk.
 | style="text-align: center;" | 
|-
! scope="row" | Aliens: Phalanx | 
 | 
 | 
 |Ataegina is an isolated world of medieval castles, varied cultures, and conquests, vibrant until a massive infestation of Xenomorphs arises and spreads relentless destruction, killing ninety percent of the planet's population. Terrified survivors flee to hidden mountain keeps where they eke out a meager existence. When a trio of young warriors discovers a new weapon, they see a chance to end the infestation. To save humanity, the trio must fight their way to the tunnels of Black Smoke Mountain—the lair of an Alien Queen, the mythical Demon Mother.
 | style="text-align: center;" | 
|-
! scope="row" | Alien: Into Charybdis | 
 | 
 | 560 pp
 | A follow-up to The Cold Forge, Into Charybdis follows the crew of the science vessel USS Gardenia, which is working for the technology supplier company McAllen Integrations. Under the company's instructions, the ship travels to Charybdis, an Iranian colony set up on the planet LV-991, to design and install vital systems to the colony's infrastructure. They instead find a Xenomorph running lose in the facility, and the chaos brewed from the creature's rampage threatens to cause a diplomatic crises between the Americans and the Iranians, prompting the Colonial Marines to respond.
 | style="text-align: center;" | 
|-
! scope="row" | Aliens: Infiltrator | 
 | 
 | 344 pp
 | A prequel to the video game Aliens: Fireteam Elite, Infiltrator stars Weyland-Yutani scientist Dr. Timothy Hoenikker. Hired by the company under the presumption that he is needed to study extraterrestrial artifacts, Hoenikker instead ends up on Pala Station, a facility run by a warped bureaucracy where Xenomorphs are being bred and the species' bio-materials are being used on other life forms. Due to the actions of an unknown saboteur, the operation predictably falls out of control.
 | style="text-align: center;" | 
|-
! scope="row" | Alien 3: The Unproduced Screenplay | 
 | 
 | 340 pp
 | Based on the earliest screenplay concept by William Gibson for the film Alien 3, The Unproduced Screenplay is an original story and sequel to Aliens that ignores the events of Alien 3 and Alien Resurrection. The Sulaco, after leaving LV-426, drifts into the territory of the Union of Progressive Peoples, a socialist human polity operating outside of the primary human sphere of influence. The four survivors are brought to the space station Anchorpoint where scientists for both the UPP and Weyland-Yutani begin experimenting with cloned Xenomorphs grown from genetic material left behind by the queen on the Sulaco. This is the third adaptation of Gibson's script, as the novel was preceded by a comic book adaptation and audio drama.
 | style="text-align: center;" | 
|-
! scope="row" | Alien: Colony War | 
 | 
 | 416 pp
 |
The story deals with rampant political discontent between the nations of Earth after the events of Into Charybdis, and introduces Chad McLaren, the husband of Amanda Ripley, who is caught in the middle of both the interhuman conflicts and efforts by the conflicting sides to weaponize the Xenomorph. The novel also contains an exclusive tie-in game scenario based on ALIEN: The Roleplaying Game titled Fallout.
| style="text-align: center;" | 
|-
! scope="row" | Alien: Inferno's Fall |Pillippa Ballantine
 |July 26, 2022
 |464 pp
 |
Starring recurring protagonist Zula Hendricks, the novel is set on Shānmén, a mining colony run by the Union of Progressive Peoples which comes under attack by an Engineer starship that unleashes various Xenomorph-like mutations upon that planet.
| style="text-align: center;" | 
|}

Collections
 The Complete Aliens Omnibus: Volume 1 – collects Earth Hive, Nightmare Asylum and The Female War (Titan Books, January 2016)
 The Complete Aliens Omnibus: Volume 2 – collects Genocide and Alien Harvest (Titan Books, June 2016)
 The Complete Aliens Omnibus: Volume 3 – collects Rogue and Labyrinth (Titan Books, December 2016)
 The Complete Aliens Omnibus: Volume 4 – collects Music of the Spears and Berserker (Titan Books, June 2017)
 The Complete Aliens Omnibus: Volume 5 – collects Original Sin and DNA War (Titan Books, December 2017)
 The Complete Aliens Omnibus: Volume 6 – collects Cauldron and Steel Egg (Titan Books, June 2018)
 The Complete Aliens Omnibus: Volume 7 – collects Criminal Enterprise and No Exit (Titan Books, December 2018)
 Aliens: Bug Hunt'' (Titan Books, April 18, 2017)

See also

 List of Alien (franchise) comics
 List of Alien vs. Predator novels
 List of Predator (franchise) novels
 List of Predator (franchise) comics

Notes

References

External links
 Dark Horse catalogue

DH Press
Alien 
Novels based on films
Alien (franchise) novels
Novels about extraterrestrial life
Novels based on comics
Novels set on fictional planets
Novels
Book series introduced in 1979